Siti Ashah binti Ghazali is a Malaysian politician who currently serves as Kedah State Executive Councillor.

Education 
She received her early education at Sekolah Kebangsaan Jeneri, Sik, from 1969 until 1971 before moving to Sekolah Kebangsaan Cemara, Jeniang. In 1973, she moved to Sekolah Kebangsaan Paya Mengkuang, Gurun, Kedah. She then continued her studies at the secondary level at Sekolah Menengah Agama Taufiqiah Khairiah Halimiah, Batu 16, Padang Lumat from 1975 to 1981. In 1988, she received the Diploma in Islamic Tasawwur from ILHAM.

Career 
 Religious Teacher in Sekolah Kebangsaan Permatang Tok Dik, Padang Serai, Kedah (1988-1985)
 Religious Teacher (Backup) in Sekolah Kebangsaan Bukit Selarong, Padang Serai, Kedah (1986)
 Member of Kedah State Executive Council 2008-2013
 Chairman of the Woman Development and Welfare Committee
 Member of Kedah State Executive Council 2020–present
 Chairman of the Rural, Human Development and Poverty Eradication Committee

Election results

Honours
  :
  Knight Companion of the Order of Loyalty to the Royal House of Kedah (DSDK) - Dato' (2012)

References 

1951 births
Living people
Malaysian people of Malay descent
Malaysian Islamic Party politicians
Members of the Kedah State Legislative Assembly
Kedah state executive councillors